= DAFI Fund =

UNHCR scholarship program for refugees

The DAFI Fund is a UNHCR scholarship program for refugees through the Albert Einstein German Academic Refugee Initiative Fund (DAFI).

== Funding ==
Funding for this program is provided by the Federal Government of Germany since 1992.

== Background ==
Since the 1990s, through the Windle Trust Uganda, the DAFI Fund has supported scholarships for refugees, internally displaced, marginalized and conflict-affected communities in Sudan and South Sudan.

The DAFI program caters for refugees throughout the country especially those from South Sudan, Sudan, Kenya, Congo among others.

Widle Trust International has been UNHCR's implementing partner for the DAFI (Albert Einstein German Academic Refugee Initiative) scholarship programme, supported by the German Government since 2005. The DAFI programme is also managed by the Windle Trusts in Kenya and Uganda.
